Visitation Academy of St. Louis is a private, all-girls, Roman Catholic school in Town and Country, Missouri (St. Louis postal address), in the Archdiocese of Saint Louis. It is a work of the Visitation Sisters who founded it in 1833.

History
Visitation Academy was established in Kaskaskia, Illinois, in 1833 by a group of sisters from the  Order of the Visitation of Holy Mary. The group originated from the Georgetown Visitation Monastery in Washington, DC, and were invited by Bishop Joseph Rosati of St. Louis to start a school in the region.

The school moved to St. Louis in 1844, in part due to flooding in Kaskaskia. The school moved again in 1892 and moved once more to the current location in 1962.

Schools
Visitation Academy is divided into three schools: Lower (preschool through grade 5), Middle (grades 6 through 8), and Upper (grades 9 through 12). The preschool is co-educational and uses the Montessori method; kindergarten through 12th grade are for girls only. The Lower School is the only all-girls school at that level in the St. Louis region.

The school is known for its small size. The Lower-Middle School has approximately 240 students; the Upper School approximately 300.

Academics
Visitation is known regionally for its rigorous academics. Students participate in the Advanced Placement (AP) program and in St. Louis University's 1818 college credit program.

The school offers classes in Latin, Spanish, and French. Lower School students receive instruction in both French and Spanish.

Extracurricular activities

Athletics

The Lower School competes in the Catholic Youth Council of St. Louis (CYC) in soccer, basketball, and volleyball.

The Upper School participates in the Missouri State High School Activities Association (MSHSAA). Sports for fall include golf, tennis, softball, cross country, field hockey, and volleyball. Winter sports include swimming, diving, racquetball, basketball, and cheerleading. In the spring, lacrosse, track and field, and soccer are played.

Fine arts

The Upper School stages several plays throughout the school year, including musicals, dramas, and student-directed plays. The theater program auditions boys from area boys' schools or co-ed schools for male parts, and sometimes recruits girls from the Lower School for child parts, e.g. for the orphans during a staging of Oliver!.

The music program in the Upper School includes a vocal choir, a handbell choir, and a liturgical choir. Two concerts are staged each year, one in the spring and one at Christmas. The Lower School also holds Christmas and Spring concerts.

The school has an art gallery where student work is displayed and, sometimes, sold. Art shows are also held in conjunction with the Upper School Spring and Christmas Concerts.

Notable alumnae
 Madonna Buder, Catholic religious sister and triathlete, known as the Iron Nun
 Pauline Pfeiffer, journalist; second wife of Ernest Hemingway
 Mary Engelbreit, 1970, graphic artist, designer, author, illustrator, entrepreneur
 Lucille Mullhall, attended 1899–1900, America's first 'Cowgirl' declared by Teddy Roosevelt
 Belle Hunt Shortridge (1858–1893), American author
Katherine Fogertey, 2001, Chief Financial Officer at Shake Shack
Katie Walsh, 2003, American politician

Notes and references

External links
 School Website

schools
Roman Catholic secondary schools in St. Louis County, Missouri
Girls' schools in Missouri
Educational institutions established in 1833
Private K-12 schools in Missouri
Roman Catholic Archdiocese of St. Louis
1833 establishments in Missouri